Portside is a  building in Cape Town, South Africa. Completed in 2014, it is the city's tallest building and at the time of completion, was Cape Town's first significant skyscraper developed in the central business district (CBD) in 15 years.

The property is jointly owned by FirstRand Bank (FNB, RMB, Wesbank and Ashburton) and Accelerate Property Fund. The bank self-occupies its share of the property, while Accelerate Property Fund is leasing office-and retail space to tenants. Accelerate Property Fund appointed Cape Town-based commercial brokerage firm Baker Street Properties to manage and market the property.

The green building council of South Africa (GBCSA) awarded the property a 5 star Green Star rating, making it the tallest Green Building in South Africa.

Conception
However, due to the late-2000s recession and difficulties around securing a hotel management contact the project was put on hold for almost three years and the design was altered.

During the design and planning phase, and after extensive public participation, it was decided to keep the building below a certain height so as not to obscure the view of Table Mountain.

The building was designed to use low energy technology throughout and is the first large building in South Africa to use almost exclusively LED lighting. The building has been awarded a five star Green Star rating from the Green Building Council of South Africa as compliant technologies have been specified throughout.

South African-based architecture studio dhk designed the building.

Construction

Construction work on the tower began on the 12 August 2011. In late March 2013 construction was temporarily halted by the City of Cape Town's disaster response unit due to strong gale-force winds making the scaffolding unstable.

References

External links

 dhk Architects website

Buildings and structures in Cape Town
Skyscrapers in Cape Town
Skyscraper office buildings in South Africa
Office buildings completed in 2014
21st-century architecture in South Africa